Iran has one of the highest urban population growth rates in the world. From 1950 to 2002, the urban proportion of the population increased from 27% to 60%. The United Nations predicts that by 2030 80% of the population will live in urban areas. Most internal migrants have settled near the cities of Tehran, Isfahan,Karaj, Ahvaz, Mashhad and Qom. Tehran, with a population of 8.7 million (2016 census), is the largest city in Iran and is the nation's capital. Tehran is home to around 11% of Iran's population. It is the hub of the country's communication and transport networks.

Mashhad, with a population of 4.2 million (as of 2019), is the second-largest Iranian city and the centre of the province of Razavi Khorasan. Mashhad is one of the holiest Shi'a cities in the world as it is the site of the Imam Reza shrine. It is the centre of tourism in Iran and between 15 and 20 million pilgrims go to Imam Reza's shrine every year.

The third most populous city of Iran is Isfahan with a population 2.5 million (as of 2019). This city is one of the most industrial cities of Iran with large industries and hosts several UNESCO World Heritage Sites. The city has a wide variety of historic monuments and is known for its paintings, history and architecture.

The fourth most populous Iranian city is Karaj, with a population of 2.1 million (as of 2019). Karaj is the capital of Alborz Province and is situated 35km west of Tehran, at the foot of Alborz mountains; however, the city is increasingly becoming an extension of metropolitan Tehran.

The fifth most populous Iranian city is Shiraz  (population 1.57 million), which is located in the southwest of Iran with a moderate climate and has been a regional trade center for over a thousand years. Shiraz is one of the oldest cities of ancient Persia, known as the city of poets, literature, flowers . It is also considered by many Iranians to be the city of gardens, and also a major center for Iran's electronic industries.

The other major cities are Tabriz (population 1.56 million), Qom (population 1.2 million), and Ahvaz (population 1.18 million).

Cities over 100,000 population
The following sorted table, lists the most populous cities in Iran with a population of more than 100,000 according to 2016 Census results announced by Statistical Center of Iran. A city is displayed in bold if it is the province capital.

Largest cities in the provinces

This is a list of the largest cities of the 31 provinces, based on the city's population as of the 2016 census.

Gallery

See also
 List of cities in Iran by province
 List of cities in Asia

References

Bibliography
 
  1969–1973
 
 
 
 
 

Cities in Iran
Cities by population
Iran